Sillimanite is an aluminosilicate mineral with the chemical formula Al2SiO5.  Sillimanite is named after the American chemist Benjamin Silliman (1779–1864). It was first described in 1824 for an occurrence in Chester, Connecticut.

Occurrence
Sillimanite is one of three aluminosilicate polymorphs, the other two being andalusite and kyanite.  A common variety of sillimanite is known as fibrolite, so named because the mineral appears like a bunch of fibres twisted together when viewed in thin section or even by the naked eye.  Both the fibrous and traditional forms of sillimanite are common in metamorphosed sedimentary rocks.  It is an index mineral indicating high temperature but variable pressure. Example rocks include gneiss and granulite.  It occurs with andalusite, kyanite, potassium feldspar, almandine, cordierite, biotite and quartz in schist, gneiss, hornfels and also rarely in pegmatites. Dumortierite and mullite are similar mineral species found in porcelain.

Sillimanite has been found in Brandywine Springs, New Castle County, Delaware.  It was named by the State Legislature in 1977 as the state mineral of Delaware by the suggestion of the Delaware Mineralogical Society.

Uses
Natural sillimanite is used in the manufacture of high alumina refractories or 55-60% alumina bricks. However, it has mostly been replaced by the other aluminosilicate polymorphs, andalusite and kyanite, for this purpose. , sillimanite was just 2% of all aluminosilicate mineral production in the western world.

Images

See also

List of minerals
List of minerals named after people

References

Aluminium minerals
Nesosilicates
Orthorhombic minerals
Minerals in space group 62
Industrial minerals
Symbols of Delaware